The Pine Bluff Arsenal is a United States Army installation in Jefferson County, Arkansas, about eight miles northwest of Pine Bluff and thirty miles southeast of Little Rock.

Pine Bluff Arsenal is one of nine Army installations in the United States that stored chemical weapons. The arsenal supplies specialized production, storage, maintenance and distribution of readiness products, and delivers technical services to the Armed Forces and Homeland Security. It also designs, manufactures and refurbishes smoke, riot control, and incendiary munitions, as well as chemical/biological defense operations items. It serves as a technology center for illuminating and infrared munitions and is also the only place in the Northern Hemisphere where white phosphorus munitions are filled. Its Homeland Security mission includes first-responder equipment training and surveillance of pre-positioned equipment.

History

World War II
The Pine Bluff Arsenal was established on November 2, 1941, for the manufacture of incendiary grenades and bombs.  5,000 acres, purchased from local physician James W. John, Sr, served as the foundation for the site. It was originally named the Chemical Warfare Arsenal but was renamed four months later.  The mission expanded to include production and storage of pyrotechnic, riot control, and chemical-filled munitions. At the height of World War II, the plant expanded from making magnesium and thermite incendiary munitions to a chemical warfare manufacturing facility as well, producing lethal gases and chemical compounds installed in artillery shells and specifically designed bombs.

Cold War and late 20th century
In an incident after World War II, several captured German rockets containing mustard agents were accidentally launched into the surrounding countryside. Biological weapons operations were conducted at the arsenal from 1953 to 1969; but operations ceased when President Nixon banned biological weapons after public outcry over Agent Orange. Between 1954 and 1967, at least seven different biological agents were produced at the facility. All biological agents were destroyed between 1971 and 1973.

21st century

The Pine Bluff Arsenal chemical weapons stockpile consisted of declared quantities of rockets, land mines, and ton containers. These obsolete weapons were safely stored in high-security structures and carefully monitored until the U.S. Army Chemical Materials Agency completed their safe elimination in November 2010. The arsenal also safely stored other items classified as non-stockpile chemical materiel, which is not part of the nation's chemical weapons stockpile. The U.S. Army Chemical Material Agency completed a number of treaty-mandated chemical warfare disposal operations at the arsenal, described below.

Pine Bluff Ton Container Decontamination Facility (PBTCDF): The PBTCDF began operations in September 2003, with the mission of decontaminating and recycling more than  containers (TCs) stored at the arsenal. The  steel containers once held hazardous materials and required decontamination for residual chemical agent hazard. This process significantly reduced liquid waste. Once decontaminated, TCs were loaded onto trailers for transport to a treatment, storage and disposal facility. There, they were cut in half, any remaining residue was removed, and the steel was recycled.

Pine Bluff Explosive Destruction System (PBEDS): PBEDS began operations in June 2006 to destroy more than 1,200 recovered chemical warfare munitions at the arsenal, the largest inventory of recovered chemical warfare materiel in the nation. The system involved three Explosive Destruction System (EDS) units, each set up in a vapor containment structure. The EDS uses cutting charges to explosively access chemical munitions, eliminating their explosive capacity before the chemical agent is neutralized. The PBEDS inventory included 4.2-inch mortars as well as German Traktor rockets, which were captured during World War II. PBEDS operators destroyed the last munition in April 2010, marking the destruction of all non-stockpile materiel declared when the United States entered into the Chemical Weapons Convention (CWC).

Pine Bluff Former Production Facilities: The arsenal once housed two chemical warfare production facilities, and NSCMP was charged with destroying them to comply with the CWC. Destroyed in 1999, the BZ Fill Facility filled munitions with the agent BZ, a hallucinogen. In 2003, NSCMP began demolition of the former Pine Bluff Integrated Binary Production Facilities (PB IBPF), designed to produce binary chemicals and fill binary chemical weapons. These weapons were designed to mix two non-lethal chemicals to form a chemical agent in flight to a target. The DF Production/M20 Canister Fill and Close Facility was the only facility operated. From 1988 to 1990 it produced the binary precursor methylphosphonic difluoride (DF), inserting the chemical into coffee can-sized M20 canisters for use in the M687 155 mm Binary Artillery Projectile. The BLU-80/B Bigeye Bomb Fill Facility, QL Production Facility and DC Production Facility never operated, and all were demolished. The final remaining PB IBPF building, intended to fill binary munitions for the Multiple Launch Rocket System, but never used for that purpose, was reutilized as the Pine Bluff Binary Destruction Facility (PB BDF), to neutralize the binary precursor chemicals DF and QL. After neutralization was completed in October 2006, demolition of the building commenced. Completed on Dec. 28, 2006, it marked the end of the PB IBPF demolition and the last former chemical warfare production facility destroyed in the United States. This accomplishment was significant since it enabled NSCMP to surpass the Chemical Weapons Convention (CWC) treaty milestone of demolition of all the nation's former production facilities four months ahead of schedule. Approximately 2,800 tons of metal were recycled from the IBPF.

Assessment: Contents of recovered items at the arsenal were identified using the Pine Bluff Munitions Assessment System (PBMAS). PBMAS determined the contents and explosive condition of items before processing to enhance safe handling, treatment and disposal. PBMAS began analyzing the items in July 2005, using an X-ray system known as Digital Radiography and Computed Tomography, along with an assessment system known as Portable Isotopic Neutron Spectroscopy. Prior to PBMAS, NSCMP also assessed 300 drums that contained recovered chemical warfare materiel, known as the XP300 mission.

Chemical Agent Identification Set (CAIS) Destruction: Another successful NSCMP mission at the arsenal included the Rapid Response System (RRS), a transportable treatment technology, which processed more than 5,300 CAIS items once stored at the arsenal. The RRS began operations in August 2005, and completed processing in November 2006. 
For decades the arsenal stored chemical agent rockets (GB55's).  During the 1980s, these were defueled and the warheads were destroyed. Mustard agent, VX, G were stored in large bunkers on the premises.

The Associated Press reported a leak in a container of white phosphorus was suspected to have ignited the fire that destroyed a warehouse at the Pine Bluff Arsenal on 6 June 2005. When the fire was extinguished, approximately 19 hours later, officials reported the fire destroyed more than 7,500 canisters of white phosphorus. In the same article, AP reported the Pine Bluff Chemical Activity was home to 12 percent of the nation's chemical weapons stockpile." This stockpile was safely destroyed March 2005 - November 2010.

Facilities
Most residents are civilians working for the Department of Defense.

Capabilities
Capabilities of the center include:  chemical defense and test equipment; individual and collective chemical protection and decontamination systems; chemical material surveillance program; machining, fabrication and assembly; specialty ammunition production; less than lethal ammunition production; and quality assurance and joint logistics services.

References

Further reading
 Disposal of Chemical Agents and Munitions Stored at Pine Bluff Arsenal, Pine Bluff, Arkansas, Final Phase I Environmental Report - Oak Ridge National Laboratory

Notes

External links

 
 
 Pine Bluff Arsenal at Military OneSource

 
1941 establishments in Arkansas
Chemical weapons destruction facilities
Cold War military installations of the United States
Historic American Engineering Record in Arkansas
Military history of Arkansas
Military installations established in 1941
Military installations in Arkansas
Pine Bluff metropolitan area
Populated places in Jefferson County, Arkansas
United States Army arsenals during World War II
United States Army Materiel Command
United States Army posts
United States biological weapons program
World War II sites in the United States